James Clifford Gill  (October 8, 1865 – April 10, 1923) was an American professional baseball player who played for the St. Louis Browns of the American Association. He appeared in two games on June 27 & July 1, 1889. He had two hits in eight at-bats in that game.

External links

1865 births
1923 deaths
19th-century baseball players
St. Louis Browns (AA) players
Major League Baseball outfielders
Major League Baseball second basemen
Baseball players from Richmond, Virginia
Allentown Peanut Eaters players
Allentown Peanuts players
York White Roses players
Scranton Indians players
Shenandoah Huns players